Usama Alshaibi (born in Baghdad, Iraq on November 20, 1969) is an Iraqi-American independent filmmaker and visual artist.

Life and career

Starting in early 2004, Alshaibi worked on a documentary on his homeland, and its current situation, titled Nice Bombs. The documentary is Alshaibi's first official release and was produced by Kristie Alshaibi, and executive produced by Studs Terkel. The documentary was funded in part by Creative Capital and the Playboy Foundation. It premiered at the 2006 Chicago Underground Film Festival where it won the Best Documentary Feature award and had Studs Terkel and Christie Hefner introduce the screening. Nice Bombs had a theatrical release in 2007, a broadcast premiere on the Sundance Channel in March 2008 and was released on DVD in October 2009.

Usama Alshaibi is interviewed in fellow Chicagoan Studs Terkel's book Hope Dies Last.

Alshaibi is the director of three narrative feature-length films, Profane,  Soak, Muhammad and Jane, and more than fifty short films. He has also produced and directed numerous music videos for a variety of musicians, including Mahjongg, Silver Jews, Panicsville and  Bobby Conn. Alshaibi was the founder and Director of the Z Film Festival (2000–2005) and his short films have toured with author Jack Sargeant's underground film programs. Several of his short films, including The Amateurs, are available on the DVD Solar Anus Cinema.

He is the elder brother of artist Sama Alshaibi and sociologist Wisam Alshaibi.

Filmography

Feature films
American Arab (2013)
Profane (2011)
Nice Bombs (2006)
Muhammad and Jane (2003)
Soak (2002)

Select Short films
Soon (2022)
In the Dirt (2020)
Here (2020)
The Desire (2020)
The Muslim Meme (2017)
The Flowering (2017)
Baghdad, Iowa (2015)
My Third Painting (2009)
Spoiled (2008)
Signal Cross Over (2007)
Dream of Samarra (2007)
Convulsion Expulsion (2004)
The Amateurs (2003)
Allahu Akbar (2003)
The Foreigner (2001)
Dogirl (2000)
Dance Habibi Dance (1999)

Select Music videos
 Tell The Police The Truth by Mahjongg (2008)
 King for a Day by Bobby Conn (2007)
 Hold My Scissors by Magic is Küntmaster (2004)
 Stabbed in the Face by Panicsville (2003)
 Angels by Bobby Conn (2002)
 Random Rules by Silver Jews (1998)

Accolades and Awards

See also
 Iraqi art
 List of Iraqi artists

References

External links

Usama Alshaibi Official Website
From Iraq to Iowa, Chicago Reader article
Usama Alshaibi interviewed in Studs Terkel's "Hope Dies Last"

American film directors
1969 births
American music video directors
Artists from Chicago
Artists from Baghdad
Iraqi contemporary artists
Iraqi emigrants to the United States
Iraqi film directors
Iraqi experimental filmmakers
Living people